Michael Edward McLachlan (April 18, 1946 – June 23, 2021) was an American attorney and politician who served as a member of the Colorado House of Representatives from district 59 from 2013 to 2015.

Early life and education
In 1965, he enlisted in the Marine Corps and served in Vietnam before being honorably discharged in 1967. He attended Southern Colorado State College (now Colorado State University Pueblo) before enrolling in the University of Arizona's law school in 1973.

Career 
Attorney General Ken Salazar appointed Rep. McLachlan to serve as Colorado's Solicitor General in 1999. He successfully defended Colorado's women's health clinic shield law in front of the U.S. Supreme Court.

He was a former president of the Durango Rotary Club and served on the Southern Ute Tribe-State of Colorado Environmental Control Commission. He has also served as the chairman of the Judicial Performance Commission for the Sixth Judicial District and as the chair of the Supreme Court Grievance Committee.

McLachlan represented House District 59 in southwestern Colorado for two years. He was elected in the 2012 election, and subsequently lost his bid for re-election during the 2014 election cycle.

He was a sponsor of a bill that created a tax break for farmers who donate extra produce to food banks. He was also a sponsor of legislation allowing charter schools to hire armed security officers.

In the November 4, 2014 mid-term elections, McLachlan was defeated for re-election by Republican J. Paul Brown. Brown won by a narrow margin of 168 votes. Due to the close nature of the election, McLachlan chose to not concede the race to Brown until November 20, 2014.

He died on June 23, 2021, at age 75.

References

External links
Mike McLachlan's campaign website

1946 births
2021 deaths
United States Marine Corps personnel of the Vietnam War
People from Dover, Delaware
Democratic Party members of the Colorado House of Representatives
United States Marines
People from Durango, Colorado
University of Nebraska alumni
Military personnel from Colorado
Colorado State University Pueblo alumni
James E. Rogers College of Law alumni
Colorado lawyers